Hamilton de Holanda is a Brazilian bandolinist known for his mixture of choro and contemporary jazz, and for his instrumental virtuosity.  Born in Rio de Janeiro he moved to Brasilia with his family as a boy. He started playing the mandolin at 5 and appeared at his first performance at six. With his brother Fernando César he formed the group Dois de Ouro and throughout his career he has collaborated with many other significant artists such as Yamandu Costa, Mike Marshall and Joel Nascimento. He has received several Latin Grammys. He has taught at the Raphael Rabello Choro academy. He plays a custom made 10 string Bandolim.

In 2015, his album Bossa Negra, a partnership with Diogo Nogueira, was nominated for the 16th Latin Grammy Awards in the Best Samba/Pagode Album category. The title track of the album was also nominated for the same award, in the Best Brazilian Song category. In 2016, he was nominated for the Latin Grammys again, this time for Best Instrumental Album, for his Samba de Chico album, which also generated a nomination for Best Engineered Album. In 2017, he received yet another nomination, this time for Producer of the Year. In 2021, he once again had an album nominated for Best Instrumental Album, this time with Canto de Praya - Ao Vivo.

His album Harmonize was considered one of the 25 best Brazilian albums of the first half of 2019 by the São Paulo Association of Art Critics.

Discography 
 1997: with Fernando César Dois de Ouro – Destroçando a Macaxeira
 1998: with Fernando César Dois de Ouro – A Nova Cara do Velho Choro
 1999: with Fernando César Dois de Ouro – Dois de Ouro
 2000: with Marco Pereira – Luz das Cordas
 2000: with Brasilia Brasil – Brasilia Brasil"(Velas) 
 2001: Caravelas – Abre Alas 2002: A música de Hamilton de Holanda - compilation 
 2003: Hamilton de Holanda - "Musica das nuvens e do chão"(Velas) 
 2005: "01 Byte 10 Strings" (Brasilianos)- solo
 2005: "Samba do Avião"- solo 
 2006: Hamilton de Holanda Quintet "Brasilianos 1"- (Brasilianos – Biscoito Fino) 
 2006: with Mike Marshall – New Words / Novas palavras (Brasilianos/Adventure)
 2007: Íntimo (Brasilianos/ Deckdisk)- solo
 2007: with André Mehmari – Contínua Amizade (Brasilianos/Deckdisk)
 2008: Hamilton de Holanda Quintet – Brasilianos 2 (Brasilianos)
 2009: with Joel Nascimento – De Bandolim a Bandolim (Brasilianos)
 2009: with Yamandú Costa – Luz da Aurora (Brasilianos)
 2010: with Ensamble Gurrufío – Sessões com Hamilton de Holanda (Brasilianos)
 2010: Esperança – Live in Europe- solo (Brasilianos)
 2010: Hamilton de Holanda Quintet & Orquestra - Brasilianos – Sinfonia Monumental(Brasilianos)
 2011: with André Mehmari – Gismontipascoal(Brasilianos)
 2011: Hamilton de Holanda Quintet – Brasilianos 3(Brasilianos)
 2013: with Stefano Bollani – O Que Será'' (ECM)
 2013: "Mundo de Pixinguinha" - Projeto Natura Musical - CD
 2014: "Bossa Negra" - com Diogo Nogueira - CD
 2014: "Pelo Brasil" - CD
 2014: "Caprichos" - CD
 2015: "Hamilton de Holanda and Baile do Almeidinha" - CD
 2015: "Alegria" - With Orquestra do Estado de Mato Grosso - CD
 2015: "Mundo de Pixinguinha" - DVD
 2016: "Samba de Chico" - CD
 2017: "Casa de Bituca" - CD
 2018: "Jacob 10ZZ" - CD
 2018: "Jacob Bossa" - CD
 2018: "Jacob Baby" - CD
 2018: "Jacob Black" - CD
 2019: "Harmonize" - CD
 2020: "Canto da Praya" - Hamilton de Holanda & João Bosco - Digital
 2020: "Canto da Praya" - Hamilton de Holanda & Mestrinho - Digital
 2020: "Ao vivo" - Brasília Brasil - Digital - (recorded at April, 2000, Brasília)

References

External links 
 Hamilton de Holanda Matrix Page

1976 births
Brazilian mandolinists
Choro musicians
Brazilian composers
Living people
Latin Grammy Award winners
Latin music songwriters
Latin music composers
Latin music record producers